The following is a list of film and television performances by American actress, producer, and children's author Jamie Lee Curtis. She made her film debut in John Carpenter's slasher film Halloween (1978); her role as Laurie Strode established her as a scream queen and led to a string of parts in horror films such as The Fog, Prom Night, Terror Train (all 1980) and Roadgames (1981). She reprised the role of Laurie in the sequels Halloween II (1981), Halloween H20: 20 Years Later (1998), Halloween: Resurrection (2002), Halloween (2018), Halloween Kills (2021), and Halloween Ends (2022). Curtis's film work spans many genres, including the cult comedies Trading Places (1983)—for which she won a BAFTA for Best Supporting Actress—and A Fish Called Wanda (1988), for which she received a BAFTA nomination for Best Actress. Her role in the 1985 film Perfect earned her a reputation as a sex symbol. She won a Golden Globe Award for her role as Helen Tasker in James Cameron's action thriller True Lies (1994); she also earned her first SAG Award nomination her performance. Her performance in Everything Everywhere All at Once (2022) earned her the first Academy Award nomination—and win—of her career, for Best Supporting Actress. To date, her films have grossed in excess of US$2.3 billion at the box office.

On television, Curtis made her acting debut in a season 2 episode of Quincy, M.E. (1977). She received a Golden Globe Award and a People's Choice Award for her role as Hannah Miller on ABC's  Anything But Love (1989–1992). She earned another Golden Globe nomination for her role in the television film The Heidi Chronicles (1996) and earned her first Primetime Emmy Award nomination for the fact based drama Nicholas' Gift (1998). She also starred as Cathy Munsch on the Fox series Scream Queens (2015–16), for which she received her seventh Golden Globe nomination.

Film

Television

See also
 List of awards and nominations received by Jamie Lee Curtis

References

External links
 

Actress filmographies
American filmographies